Tiere (or Tièrè) is a village and seat of the commune of Diouradougou Kafo in the Cercle of Koutiala in the Sikasso Region of southern Mali. The village lies 80 km south of Koutiala.

References

Populated places in Sikasso Region